Process of Decay is a concept album by death metal band Desecration. The album portrays the complete decomposition of a corpse between death and burial.

Track listing
All songs written and arranged by Desecration.
"When The Heart Stops Beating..."
"Initial Decay"
"Bacterial Breakdown"
"Black Putrefaction"
"Butyric Fermentation"
"Maggots In Evidence"
"Corpse Fauna"
"Dry Rot"
"Grave Wax"

2005 albums
Desecration (band) albums